Ledgerwood is a surname. Notable people with the surname include:

Judy Ledgerwood (born 1959), American painter and educator
Julie Ledgerwood, American allergist and immunologist
J. T. Ledgerwood (1879–1976), American politician
Nikolas Ledgerwood (born 1985), Canadian soccer player
Tom Ledgerwood (1923–2006), Scottish footballer
Austin Ledgerwood (2004-), American Cross Country + Track & Field, Commercial Airline Pilot

See also
 Ledger Wood (1901-1970), American philosopher